Paul Simon's Concert in the Park is a live album and concert film recorded by Paul Simon as part of his 1991-2 "Born at the Right Time" Tour, with an extensive live backing band comprising top studio and touring musicians as well as a guest appearance at the start by the Brazilian percussion group Olodum. The concert took place in Central Park, New York City on August 15, 1991 and was broadcast live on the HBO television network as well as being recorded for audio and video release.

Recording plus initial and subsequent release details
Paul Simon's Concert in the Park was recorded during Simon's worldwide 1991-2 "Born at the Right Time" Tour and provided a survey of his two most recent albums, Graceland and Rhythm of the Saints, and also drew liberally from his earlier songbook including a number of tunes from the Simon and Garfunkel era. 600,000 people were initially claimed to have attended the show, which was held in New York's Central Park on August 15, 1991. Later estimates determined that the maximum number of people who could fit in the park space was 48,500. The concert was similar to The Concert in Central Park, a reunion concert for Simon and Garfunkel held ten years earlier. The concert was broadcast live on TV on the HBO channel and was reportedly recorded live through 96 microphone channels and 20 discrete stage mixers. It was then released, with minor track differences, on audio as double live-album (LP), double CD, and audiocassette, and on video as a VHS tape and Laserdisc. A DVD release was not made for many years due to contractual difficulties but finally appeared in 2018 as a PBS exclusive.

Reception

On its release, the audio version of the album reached only a "disappointing" no. 60 and stayed in the charts for just one week. However, critical reaction was good; writing in 1997, Chris Charlesworth states:
From the snap crackle and pop of the drum fanfare to the mellifluous beauty of the loveliest version of 'Sounds of Silence' you'll find anywhere, Paul Simon's Concert in the Park is the (double) album to own if you want only one Paul Simon album on your shelf ... [Simon's] meticulous attention to detail shines out in the re-arrangements of every song.

On AllMusic, William Ruhlmann gives the album four stars out of five, and writes:
Simon made such stylistically various material work together by front-loading the set with the newer stuff and rearranging some of the older solo stuff, so that "Kodachrome," for example, was refitted with a guitar line courtesy of Graceland player Ray Phiri ... Simon also toned down the Brazilian percussion that had dominated the Saints material and sang it more convincingly, so that "Born at the Right Time," for example, was far more effective than it had been in its studio version. On the whole, then, Concert in the Park managed to be an enjoyable and surprisingly cohesive career summary.

Track listing

The band
 Paul Simon - vocals, acoustic guitar (electric on "Late in the Evening" and "The Sound of Silence")
 Mingo Araujo - percussion
 Cyro Baptista - percussion
 Chris Botti - trumpet
 Michael Brecker - saxophones, EWI
 Tony Cedras - piano, keyboards, accordion
 Dom Chacal - percussion
 Steve Gadd - drums
 Sidinho Moreira - percussion
 Vincent Nguini - guitar
 Ray Phiri - guitar
 Barney Rachabane - saxophone, pennywhistle
 Armand Sabal-Lecco - bass guitar
 John Selolwane - guitar
 Richard Tee - musical director, piano
 The Waters (Oren Waters, Maxine Waters and Julia Waters) - vocals

Special Guests: Briz and Grupo Cultural OLODUM for "The Obvious Child" and Chevy Chase join Paul, dancing for the second of two performances of "You Can Call Me Al".

Formats
This title was released in both audio and video formats.

As a double live-album, it was released on CD, cassette and vinyl LP.
Both VHS and Laserdisc formats were released with "Cecilia" omitted from the VHS and both "Cecilia" and "The Coast" omitted from the Laserdisc.

In July 2011 a Facebook campaign  was started to request a release of the concert on DVD and Blu-ray. It was released on DVD in 2018 through PBS membership rewards. The long delay could be due to the contract with Pioneer that restricted the re-issue of concerts by artists signed to Warner on any future format.

Trivia 

 Actor Chevy Chase made a guest appearance on stage for the song "You Can Call Me Al". Chase also starred in the official music video for the song.

Charts

Certifications

References

Paul Simon live albums
1991 live albums
Warner Records live albums
Albums recorded at Central Park